Chris Valicevic (born April 25, 1968) is an American former professional ice hockey defenseman of Croatian ancestry. who spent the majority of his career with the ECHL's Louisiana IceGators. He is the fifth all-time career scorer in the ECHL with 611 points.

ECHL
Valicevic spent seven seasons with the Louisiana IceGators, and was named to the ECHL All-Star Game seven times, an ECHL record. Of those seven times he was named to the All-Star team, he was named to the First Team All-ECHL team five time, also an ECHL record. Valicevic was also named ECHL Most Valuable Player for the 1998-1999 season. Valicevic retired with 460 assists and 611 points, which made him the career regular season and postseason leader among defensemen in assists and points. His 102 postseason games are also an ECHL record.

In 2008, Valievic was inducted into the ECHL Hall of Fame. Valicevic was joined by ECHL founder Henry Brabham, the league's first commissioner Patrick J. Kelly, and goaltender Nick Vitucci as members of the Hall of Fame's inaugural class.

Awards
1993–94: ECHL All-Star
1995–96: ECHL All-Star
1995–96: ECHL Defenseman Of The Year
1996–97: ECHL All-Star
1996–97: ECHL Defenseman Of The Year
1997–98: ECHL All-Star
1997–98: ECHL Defenseman Of The Year
1998–99: ECHL All-Star
1998–99: ECHL Defenseman Of The Year
1998–99: ECHL Most Valuable Player
1999–2000: ECHL All-Star
2000–01: ECHL All-Star
2007–08: Named to the ECHL Hall of Fame

References

External links

1968 births
Living people
American men's ice hockey defensemen
Cornwall Aces players
Greensboro Monarchs players
Houston Aeros (1994–2013) players
Ice hockey players from Michigan
Louisiana IceGators (ECHL) players
People from Mount Clemens, Michigan
Portland Rage players
New Jersey Rockin' Rollers players
Sacramento River Rats players
Sportspeople from Metro Detroit
Worcester IceCats players